The 4-mile (6.4–km) St. George Island Bridge (officially named the Bryant Patton Memorial Bridge and designated State Road 300 from end to end, plus approaches) was built in 2002 (completed in 2004) when the two original bridges (cut by an island in the middle) that led to St. George Island, a small resort community  from Apalachicola, Florida, were deemed unsafe due to their old age. The original bridges opened in 1965; prior to that, visitors used a ferry to get to the island. The new bridge, by bypassing the middle island, became the 3rd-longest bridge in Florida. The north end of SR 300 is at US 98 (SR 30) in Eastpoint. It was opened on February 27, 2004.

Initially, the bridge was designated State Road G1A by the Florida Department of Transportation while Gulf Beach Drive on the island east of the bridge was given the SR 300 designation. Later, the bridge and Gulf Beach Drive were both SR 300.  More recently, Gulf Beach Drive lost its State Road designation, leaving only the St. George Island Bridge with the SR 300 designation. The eastern half of Gulf Beach Drive is now County Road 300.

"State Road G1A" was an analogue on the Gulf of Mexico to SR A1A on the Atlantic Ocean. It is one of two x00 routes to not follow the numbering system - the other is SR 800, a short connection over the Intracoastal Waterway in Boca Raton. All other x00 routes are major cross-state diagonals.

Major intersections

See also 
 State Road A19A

References 

Bridges completed in 2004
Transportation buildings and structures in Franklin County, Florida
Road bridges in Florida
2004 establishments in Florida